Ivirua is one of the six traditional districts of the island of Mangaia in the Cook Islands. It is located in the east of the island, to the southeast of the District of Karanga and north of the District of Tamarua. The district was traditionally divided into 6 tapere:
 Te-pauru-o-Rongo
 Te-korokoro
 Te-uturei
 Te-ara-nui-o-Toi
 Te-i'i-maru
 Avarari 

The major habitation is the village of Ivirua.

References

Districts of the Cook Islands
Mangaia